Polina Dashkova (born 14 July 1960) is a successful Russian crime novelist.

Life
Dashkova was born in Moscow in 1960. She was educated at the Maxim Gorky Literature Institute and then she worked as a journalist and as a translator from English. Her first novel was published in 1996. Since then she has published a series of books which are based upon the recent time of changes in Russia. She has sold over 40 million books.

She has sold 300,000 books in Germany and she won the Krimipreis crime award from Radio Bremen in 2006. At least a dozen of her books have been translated into German. A few of her books have been translated into Chinese, Dutch, French, German, Polish, Spanish.

Works

References

1960 births
Living people
Writers from Moscow
Russian women novelists
20th-century Russian women writers
Maxim Gorky Literature Institute alumni